The chestnut-throated apalis (Apalis porphyrolaema) is a species of bird in the cisticola family Cisticolidae. The Kabobo apalis, originally described as a distinct species, is usually treated as a subspecies A. p. kaboboensis of the chestnut-throated apalis today. It is itself sometimes considered to be the same species as the Chapin's apalis.

Distribution and habitat
The species is found in Burundi, Democratic Republic of the Congo, Kenya, Rwanda, Tanzania and Uganda, where it is a species of highland forests above 1600 m.

Description
The chestnut-throated apalis is a 12 cm long apalis with mostly grey plumage. The nominate subspecies and the subspecies affinis both have chestnut throats, whereas the Kabobo apalis has an entirely grey throat but paler undersides.

Ecology
The chestnut-throated apalis feeds on insects and other small invertebrates, which are obtained by gleaning from leaves and twigs, hover gleaning and hawking in the air.

References

chestnut-throated apalis
Birds of East Africa
chestnut-throated apalis
Taxa named by Oscar Neumann
Taxonomy articles created by Polbot